Yelkhovsky District is an administrative and municipal district (raion), one of the twenty-seven in Samara Oblast, Russia. It is located in the north of the oblast. Its administrative center is the rural locality (a selo) of Yelkhovka. Population: 10,046 (2010 Census);  The population of Yelkhovka accounts for 32.5% of the district's total population.

History
The district was first established on May 14, 1928 within Middle Volga Oblast. It went through a number of changes, transformations, and abolitions, and was re-established in its current form on January 13, 1992.

References

Notes

Sources

Districts of Samara Oblast

